The 1894–95 season was Burslem Port Vale's third consecutive season of football in the English Football League. The progress of the previous season was lost, as 19 of the 30 league games ended in defeat. Only nearby Crewe Alexandra finished below the Vale, however only Walsall Town Swifts failed to gain re-election – despite finishing two points ahead of Vale. As was the case in 1892–93, the Vale found great difficulty in scoring goals, with only Crewe scoring fewer.

A season to forget, the club fared no better the following season, and lost their Football League status between 1896–1898. Their 2–2 draw at Crewe on 5 January 1895 was their final away draw until 3 December 1898, as the team fared extremely poorly on the road, losing almost all their away games.

Overview

Second Division

An opening day victory over Walsall Town Swifts betrayed what would be a difficult season for the "Valeites". Following the opening day they won just one of their next 21 league games, with only four of these games ending in a draw. During this streak they lost 10–0 at Notts County on 26 February 1895, after three players failed to turn up, leaving reserve players to make up the numbers. Seemingly destined for a rock bottom finish, they rallied at the season's end to win five of their last seven games. One of these victories was a 7–1 demolition of Lincoln City, with big victories also coming over Grimsby Town and Crewe Alexandra. At the end of the season the Vale were 30 points behind champions Bury, and six points off safety, but were re-elected to the league.

Goalkeeper Tom Baddeley was the only ever-present throughout the season, with left-back Dick Ray missing just one game. Billy Beats, George Samuel Eccles, Meshach Dean, and Alf Wood, favourites of previous campaigns, rarely missed a match. At the end of the season Wood left for Southampton, and Ray for Manchester City. With their places filled with reserves the next season looked bleak.

Finances
Financially the club struggled, with attendances down due to continuing defeats, the pay rises the players had for the good work the previous season damaged the budget.

Cup competitions
For the fourth consecutive season they exited the FA Cup in the first round of qualification, for the second consecutive season they scored three goals in their defeat, this time Stourbridge scored five.

League table

Results

Football League Second Division

Burslem Port Vale's score comes first

Results by matchday

Matches

FA Cup

Birmingham Senior Cup

Staffordshire Senior Cup

Player statistics

Appearances

Top scorers

Transfers

Transfers in

Transfers out

References
Specific

General

Port Vale F.C. seasons
Burslem Port Vale